Shady Hills may refer to:

Shady Hills, Florida, a census-designated place in Pasco County, Florida, United States
Shady Hills, Indiana, a neighborhood north of Marion, Grant County, Indiana, United States